Maung O, Prince of Salin  (also spelt Maung Oh, ; ? – 12 May 1840), was a prince of the first rank of the Konbaung dynasty. He was the brother of Nanmadaw Me Nu, the chief queen of King Bagyidaw. He was granted the appanage of Salin, with the title of Thado Maha Thudhamma Yaza. He and Me Nu became the de facto rulers and are some examples of powerful figures who were the most powerful officials of their time.

Life

Early life

Maung O was born to U Hlote, commander of a thousand-man cavalry regiment (later Thiha Kyawswa of Shwedaung) and Daw Nge in Phalangon. He had a younger sister, Me Nu, who later became the chief queen. He was married to Ma Min Tha, from a nearby village Myinpauk. The couple had two daughters: Thiri Thukalaya, Duchess of Amyint, and Thiri Thuta Yadana, Duchess of Saku. He authored the Yazawunthadipaka, a chronicle of the Konbaung dynasty.

Rise and fall
Maung O's rise to power was due to his sister Nanmadaw Me Nu becoming King Bagyidaw's favorite queen. The king gave his brother-in-law Salin in fief and granted him the title of great prince in 1823. He was the only non-royal to hold the title of great prince. He along with his sister and Gen. Maha Bandula became the leaders of the faction that advocated for war with the British. After the disastrous First Anglo-Burmese War (1824–1826) left the country crippled, Bagyidaw became increasingly reclusive, afflicted by bouts of depression, and could not handle the administration of the state. The court power devolved to his chief queen Me Nu and her brother. Me Nu and Maung O became the de facto rulers of the country. They were much feared due to their tyrannical policies.

Maung O came into conflict with the Crown Prince Tharrawaddy. When Tharrawaddy wanted to renew the war with the British by going to Rangoon himself, Maung O suggested to the king that it was a ploy by Tharrawaddy to revolt. The conflict between O and the crown prince led to Tharrawaddy's eventual revolt. On 21 February 1837, troops on the order of Maung O raided the residence of Princess Pagan (Bagan), sister of Tharawaddy. As the raid continued at the mansion of Prince Tharawaddy, fire was exchanged between the troops of the prince's mansion and the raiding troops. On 24 February 1837, Maung O set fire to the mansion of the crown prince, forcing the crown prince to leave for Shwebo, the ancestral place of the Konbaung kings, with 500 troops. Then Prince Tharrawaddy raised a rebellion.

By April, Tharrawaddy had forced Bagyidaw to abdicate. The new king put his brother under house arrest and sentenced Me Nu and Maung O to death on 12 May 1840.

The trader Edge Gorger, who visited the Inwa palace during the reign of King Bagyidaw described Maung O as

References

Bibliography
 
 

1840 deaths
Burmese princes
People of the First Anglo-Burmese War